State Road 739 (SR 739) is a  commercial highway running from San Carlos Park, Florida to North Fort Myers that is also known as U.S. Route 41 Business for the northernmost  of its route.

Route description
The southern terminus of SR 739 is an intersection with US 41 near San Carlos Park. SR 739 is known as Michael G. Rippe Parkway for its first three miles. Immediately north of the southern terminus is an interchange with Alico Road (CR 840) which includes only a southbound exit and northbound entrance.  SR 739 crosses the interchange and the Seminole Gulf Railway on a large overpass. From the Alico interchange, SR 739 becomes six lanes and continues north, paralleling the Seminole Gulf Railway and passing through the Briarcliff neighborhood.

At its intersection with Six Mile Cypress Parkway (SR 865) in south Fort Myers, SR 739 becomes known as Metro Parkway and continues northward. It is reduced to five lanes with a middle turn lane at the intersection with Daniels Parkway (CR 876). SR 739 then passes to the east of the Villas neighborhood, Page Field, and the Chico's World Headquarters.  It intersects with Colonial Boulevard (SR 884), Lee County's primary east-west highway, shortly after entering Fort Myers city limits. 

At Winkler Avenue, SR 739 becomes six lanes again and turns northwest.  An overpass carries it over the Ten Mile Canal and the Seminole Gulf Railway's freight yard.  At LeeTran Boulevard, the northbound lanes continue onto Evans Avenue, while the southbound lanes connect to Fowler Street.

SR 739 continues north along Evans Avenue and Fowler Street. Currently, Evans Avenue is a one-way street north of LeeTran Boulevard, and has three northbound lanes while Fowler Street carries four lanes of bi-directional traffic. This unusual configuration continues to just south of downtown Fort Myers at the intersection of State Road 82 (Dr. Martin Luther King Jr. Boulevard). Fowler Street's northbound lanes terminate at SR 82, and from here north, Evans Avenue (which becomes Park Avenue shortly after SR 82) carries all northbound traffic, and Fowler Street carries all southbound traffic with three lanes each.

At the intersection with SR 80 just east of downtown Fort Myers, SR 739 becomes concurrent with U.S. Route 41 Business, and SR 739 becomes a hidden designation from this point north. It then intersects SR 80 and crosses the Caloosahatchee River on the Edison Bridge. The northbound and southbound streets rejoin into a single six-lane roadway at the north end of the Edison Bridge spans, and travel into North Fort Myers, Florida along the original Tamiami Trail.

SR 739 is then reduced to four lanes divided after the intersection of Pine Island Road/Bayshore Road (SR 78), and terminates shortly after at the mainline of US 41 north of North Fort Myers.

History
The northern portion of SR 739 through North Fort Myers was originally the route of the Tamiami Trail (U.S. Route 41), a roadway connecting Tampa and Miami.  The route through North Fort Myers north of Pine Island Road was complete in the 1920s along with the rest of the Tamiami Trail.  The route south of this point was completed in 1931 when the Tamiami Trail was rerouted on to the original Edison Bridge over the Caloosahatchee River from its original bridge further upstream.  US 41 would carry the hidden designation SR 45 after the 1945 Florida State Road renumbering. In 1964, US 41 was rerouted to its current alignment to the west upon the completion of the Caloosahatchee Bridge.  After the realignment of US 41, the original route became US 41 Business with the hidden designation of State Road 739.  SR 739 would continue down Fowler Street to Hanson Street.

The Metro Parkway portion of SR 739 initially ran from Hanson Street (at Old Metro Parkway) to Colonial Boulevard in the 1980s, but was extended south parallel to the railroad to Daniels Parkway due to a boom in need for new business sites.  At this point, SR 739 ran along Hanson Street between Fowler Street and Metro Parkway.  Metro Parkway was extended south to Six Mile Cypress Parkway in the early 1990s due to the building of Gulf Coast Medical Center.

SR 739 was split into its current alignment of one-way street pairs north of SR 82 in the early 1990s when the current dual Edison Bridge spans were completed, replacing the original drawbridge.  More of Evans Avenue was converted to one-way as far south as Hanson Street in 2008 to carry SR 739 northbound.  This was part of a larger project that would have later converted the adjacent segment of Fowler Street to one-way to be Evans Avenue's southbound counterpart.  However, further conversion of Fowler Street was heavily opposed by the city of Fort Myers and local business owners, and was subsequently cancelled (though Evans Avenue's conversion had already been completed).

SR 739 was extended to its current southern terminus in late 2012 with the completion of Michael G. Rippe Parkway.  That extension, which was named for former Florida Department of Transportation district director Michael G. Rippe, had been planned as early as the 1990s and was funded by the American Recovery and Reinvestment Act of 2009.

The current alignment of SR 739 between Winkler Avenue and Hanson Street, which included the bridge over the Seminole Gulf Railway yard, was completed in late 2015.  This removed SR 739 from Hanson Street, and the original alignment of Metro Parkway was renamed Old Metro Parkway.

Evans Avenue is named for Major James Evans, who is one of the founders of Fort Myers.

Major intersections

References

External links

739
739
Transportation in Fort Myers, Florida
U.S. Route 41